The voiced dental fricative is a consonant sound used in some spoken languages. It is familiar to English-speakers as the th sound in father. Such fricatives are often called "interdental" because they are often produced with the tongue between the upper and lower teeth (as in Received Pronunciation), and not just against the back of the upper teeth, as they are with other dental consonants.

The letter  is sometimes used to represent the dental approximant, a similar sound, which no language is known to contrast with a dental non-sibilant fricative, but the approximant is more clearly written with the lowering diacritic: . 
It has been proposed that either a turned ⟨⟩ or reversed ⟨⟩ be used as a dedicated symbol for the dental approximant, but despite occasional usage, this has not gained general acceptance.

The fricative and its unvoiced counterpart are rare phonemes. Almost all languages of Europe and Asia, such as German, French, Persian, Japanese, and Mandarin, lack the sound. Native speakers of languages without the sound often have difficulty enunciating or distinguishing it, and they replace it with a voiced alveolar sibilant , a voiced dental stop or voiced alveolar stop , or a voiced labiodental fricative ; known respectively as th-alveolarization, th-stopping, and th-fronting. As for Europe, there seems to be a great arc where the sound (and/or its unvoiced variant) is present. Most of Mainland Europe lacks the sound. However, some "periphery" languages as Gascon, Welsh, English, Icelandic, Elfdalian, Kven, Northern Sami, Inari Sami, Skolt Sami, Ume Sami, Mari, Greek, Albanian, Sardinian, Aromanian, some dialects of Basque and most speakers of Spanish have the sound in their consonant inventories, as phonemes or allophones.

Within Turkic languages, Bashkir and Turkmen have both voiced and voiceless dental non-sibilant fricatives among their consonants. Among Semitic languages, they are used in Modern Standard Arabic, albeit not by all speakers of modern Arabic dialects, and in some dialects of Hebrew and Assyrian.

Features
Features of the voiced dental non-sibilant fricative:

 It does not have the grooved tongue and directed airflow, or the high frequencies, of a sibilant.

Occurrence
In the following transcriptions, the undertack diacritic may be used to indicate an approximant .

Danish  is actually a velarized alveolar approximant.

See also
 Voiced alveolar non-sibilant fricative
 
 Index of phonetics articles

Notes

References

External links
 

Dental consonants
Fricative consonants
Approximant consonants
English th
Pulmonic consonants
Voiced oral consonants
Central consonants